Fontaine-les-Bassets is a commune in the Orne department in north-western France.

See also
Communes of the Orne department

References

Fontainelesbassets